Brižitka Molnar (born 28 July 1985 in Torak, Serbia) is a retired Serbian volleyball player who plays as an outside hitter. 

She competed in the 2008 Summer Olympics where she was eliminated with the Serbian team in the quarter-finals of the tournament, and at the 2013 FIVB World Grand Prix.

Clubs

Awards

Club 
 2010 Greek Championship with Panathinaikos
 2010 Greek Cup with Panathinaikos
 2011 Greek Championship with Panathinaikos
 2012 Turkish Volleyball Super Cup -  Runner-Up, with Galatasaray Daikin
 2012-2013 Turkish Women's Volleyball Cup -  Bronze Medal with Galatasaray Daikin

References

External links
 

1985 births
Living people
Olympic volleyball players of Serbia
Volleyball players at the 2008 Summer Olympics
Panathinaikos Women's Volleyball players
Galatasaray S.K. (women's volleyball) players
Serbian people of Hungarian descent
Hungarians in Vojvodina
Serbian women's volleyball players
People from Torak (Žitište)
Volleyball players at the 2015 European Games
European Games medalists in volleyball
European Games bronze medalists for Serbia
European champions for Serbia

Serbian expatriate sportspeople in Romania
Serbian expatriate sportspeople in Greece
Serbian expatriate sportspeople in Japan
Serbian expatriate sportspeople in Turkey
Serbian expatriate sportspeople in Poland
Serbian expatriate sportspeople in China